Gangs of New York is a 1938 American film directed by James Cruze and written by Samuel Fuller.

Crime lord Rocky Thorpe is impersonated by police officer John Franklin in order to infiltrate his organization and bring an end to it once and for all.

Cast

Charles Bickford as Rocky Thorpe/John Franklin
Ann Dvorak as Connie Benson
Alan Baxter as 'Dapper' Mallare
Wynne Gibson as Orchid
Harold Huber as Panatella
Willard Robertson as Inspector Sullivan
Maxie Rosenbloom as Tombstone
Charles Trowbridge as District Attorney Lucas
John Wray as Maddock
Jonathan Hale as Warden
Fred Kohler as Kruger
Howard Phillips as Al Benson
Robert Gleckler as Nolan
Elliott Sullivan as Hopkins
Maurice Cass as Phillips

References

External links

1938 films
1938 crime drama films
1930s English-language films
American black-and-white films
Republic Pictures films
American crime drama films
Films directed by James Cruze
1930s American films